Aspidosperma is a genus of flowering plant in the family Apocynaceae, first described as a genus in 1824. It is native to South America, Central America, southern Mexico, and the West Indies.

Species

References

 
Apocynaceae genera